Heide Solveig Göttner (born 1969 in Munich) is a German fantasy writer.

Life
Heide Solveig Göttner grew up in Munich. She began writing at a young age. She studied English studies, American studies and political science at the Ludwig-Maximilians-Universität. She won a literature scholarship of Munich in 1992. She has been working as a foreign language lecturer since 1997.  Her fantasy novels are based on the history and mythology of Sardinia. Göttner combined reading from her books with music.

Heide Solveig Göttner lives with her Sardinian boyfriend in Freiburg im Breisgau.

Literature
Trilogy: Die Insel der Stürme

References

External links
Heide Solveig Göttner at Piper Verlag 
Interview with Heide Solveig Göttner 

German fantasy writers
1969 births
Living people
Writers from Munich
Ludwig Maximilian University of Munich alumni
Writers from Freiburg im Breisgau